Phlaeoba infumata is a species of short-horned grasshopper in the family Acrididae. It is found in Indomalaya.

References

External links

 

Acridinae
Insects described in 1893